Alan Baker (born July 15, 1956) is a Republican member of the Alabama House of Representatives, representing the 66th district, Baldwin and Escambia counties.

Baker has represented the 66th district since 2006.

See also
List of Auburn University people

References 

1956 births
Living people
Auburn University alumni
Republican Party members of the Alabama House of Representatives
People from Brewton, Alabama
21st-century American politicians